Korol is a surname. Notable persons with that name include:

 Abraham B Korol (born 1946), Israeli geneticist
 Adam Korol, (born 1974), Polish rower
 Aleksey Korol (born 1977), Ukrainian footballer
 Anton Korol (1916–1981), German military pilot
 Fyodor Korol (1894–1942), Soviet general
 Gennadiy Korol, video game programmer and founder of Moon Studios
 Ihor Korol (born 1971), Ukrainian footballer
 Jaroslava Korol (1954–2009), Ukrainian painter
 Oleg Korol (born 1969), Belarusian footballer
 Osman Zati Korol (1880–1946), Turkish military officer
 Petro Korol, (born 1941), Ukrainian weightlifter
 Yelizaveta Korol (born 1994), Kazakhstani sports shooter
 Yevhen Korol (born 1947), Ukrainian footballer
 Suneer Korol

See also